Adam Michael Jarchow (born November 10, 1978) is an American attorney and Republican politician. He served two terms in the Wisconsin State Assembly, representing the 28th Assembly district in northwest Wisconsin. He was a candidate for Attorney General of Wisconsin in the 2022 Republican primary.

Biography

Jarchow was born in Saint Paul, Minnesota. He lived in Balsam Lake, Wisconsin and graduated from Clear Lake High School, in Clear Lake, Wisconsin. Jarchow received his bachelor's degree from University of Florida and his J.D. degree from University of Florida College of Law.

Career 
After graduating from law school, Jarchow practiced law in Florida and Minnesota before returning to Wisconsin to practice law in New Richmond. On November 4, 2014, Jarchow was elected to the Wisconsin State Assembly as a Republican. In a special election for a state senate seat in January 2018, he was defeated by Patty Schachtner. Jarchow did not run for a third term in the Assembly in 2018.

In October 2021, he announced he would be a candidate for attorney general of Wisconsin in the 2022 election, challenging incumbent Democratic attorney general Josh Kaul. He faces a primary against Fond du Lac County District Attorney Eric Toney in August 2022.

Electoral history

Wisconsin Assembly (2014, 2016)

| colspan="6" style="text-align:center;background-color: #e9e9e9;"| General Election, November 4, 2014

| colspan="6" style="text-align:center;background-color: #e9e9e9;"| General Election, November 8, 2016

Wisconsin Senate (2018)

| colspan="6" style="text-align:center;background-color: #e9e9e9;"| Republican Primary, December 19, 2017

| colspan="6" style="text-align:center;background-color: #e9e9e9;"| Special Election, January 16, 2018

References

1978 births
21st-century American politicians
Fredric G. Levin College of Law alumni
Florida lawyers
Living people
Republican Party members of the Wisconsin State Assembly
Minnesota lawyers
People from New Richmond, Wisconsin
People from Polk County, Wisconsin
Politicians from Saint Paul, Minnesota
University of Florida alumni
Wisconsin lawyers